Jin Prefecture, also known by its Chinese name Jinzhou, was a prefecture of imperial China. Its seat—also known as Jinzhou—was at Xicheng (modern Ankang, Shaanxi).

History
Jin was created from Eastern Liang Prefecture (Dōngliángzhōu) in AD 554 under the Western Wei Dynasty. Its name—the "gold" or "golden" prefecture—derives from the placer deposits along the Yue or Moon River still exploited to this day.

Under the Sui, it was renamed Xicheng Commandery (Xīchéngjùn). Under the Tang, it was renamed Ankang Commandery (Ānkāngjùn). It held 53,029 people in 14,091 households in 639 and 57,929 people in the same number of households in 742.

It was abolished again under the Ming in 1583.

Geography
Jin Commandery in the Tang dynasty lay around modern Ankang, Shaanxi. It probably includes parts of modern Ankang, Hanyin, Xunyang, and Shiquan.

See also
 Other Jin Prefectures/Jinzhous

References

Citations

Bibliography
 . 
 .

Prefectures of the Sui dynasty
Prefectures of the Tang dynasty
Prefectures of Former Shu
Prefectures of Later Tang
Prefectures of Later Zhou
Prefectures of Later Jin (Five Dynasties)
Prefectures of Later Han (Five Dynasties)
Prefectures of the Song dynasty
Prefectures of the Yuan dynasty
Subprefectures of the Ming dynasty
Former prefectures in Shaanxi